The English Open is a professional ranking snooker tournament.

History
On 29 April 2015 World Snooker chairman Barry Hearn announced that the event called English Open will be held for the first time in 2016 in Manchester, England, as part of a new Home Nations Series with the existing Welsh Open and new Northern Ireland Open and Scottish Open tournaments. The winner of the English Open is awarded the Davis Trophy which is named in honour of former world champion Steve Davis.

The inaugural event took place between 10 and 16 October 2016, and was won by Liang Wenbo.

Winners

References

 

 

2016 establishments in England
Snooker ranking tournaments
Snooker competitions in England
Recurring sporting events established in 2016